Parron Airport  is a public use airport located near Parron, Maule, Chile.

See also
Talk:Parron Airport
List of airports in Chile

References

External links 
 Airport record for Parron Airport at Landings.com

Airports in Chile
Airports in Maule Region